Richard Pudney (born 6 June 1978) is a New Zealand former cricketer. He played two first-class and one List A matches for Auckland between 2000 and 2002.

See also
 List of Auckland representative cricketers

References

External links
 

1978 births
Living people
New Zealand cricketers
Auckland cricketers
Cricketers from Auckland